Nepean Football Association (NFA) is the governing body of amateur football across the Penrith, Hawkesbury and Blue Mountains areas of western Sydney. Clubs are located in four council areas, City of Penrith, City of Blue Mountains, City of Hawkesbury and Wollondilly Shire. Its administrative offices are located in Penrith.

History
Nepean Junior Soccer Association was formed 9 November 1961 with the first competitions commencing in 1962. They were later to be known as Nepean District Soccer Association, then Nepean District Soccer Football Association before settling on Nepean Football Association (2014) as the word football steadily replaces soccer across Australia.

Clubs and competitions

Nepean FC
NFA are responsible for the administration and running of Nepean FC who were formed in 2011 and as at 2021 compete in NSW NPL 4 league for Men, the Women's NPL2 competition and Boys Youth NPL 2.

Competitions
NFA organises football across all competitions including Mini Roos (ages 5–11), competitive junior football for boys and girls (ages 12–17), intermediate age groups (ages 18–21), men (including over 35s) and women. As at 2018 there were 13 men's divisions, 5 men's over 35's divisions and 5 women's divisions. In 2017 there were 12,223 registered players in the Nepean area across 31 clubs

The association also conducts activities for athletes with special needs with the Nepean Dragons Football group. They run a summer football competition at two venues (Penrith & Springwood) along with other venues in the Hawkesbury and Blue Mountains.

Current Clubs

The following clubs currently have teams participating in NFA competitions:

Defunct or Former Clubs

 Blue Mountains Grammar School SC
 Cherrywood Soccer Club
 Claremont Meadows Soccer Club
 Londonderry Soccer Club
 Western Storm Soccer Club
 Blackheath Football Club (now participates in Lithgow District Football Association)

Notable players

The following players have played football for clubs in the NFA who have gone on to represent the Australian Men's and Women's National Teams:

 Leah Blayney - Wentworth Falls Football Club 
 Mark Bridge - St Marys Soccer Club 
 Luke Casserly - Colo Soccer Football Club 
 Michael Gibson - Penrith RSL Soccer Club 
 Ian Hunter - Blue Mountains Football Club 
 Jenna Kingsley - Emu Plains Football Club & Penrith RSL Soccer Club
 Mark Schwarzer - Colo Soccer Football Club 
 Mile Jedinak - Werrington Football Club 
 Teigen Allen - Emu Plains Football Club
 Bryleeh Henry - Penrith Football Club

References

External links
 Official Website
 Lowland Wanderers Website

Soccer leagues in New South Wales
South
Soccer in Australia